"The Thrill Is Gone" is a popular song composed by Ray Henderson with lyrics by Lew Brown which was first sung by Everett Marshall in the Broadway revue George White's Scandals in 1931.

The song was first recorded in 1931 by Rudy Vallée And His Connecticut Yankees on the Victor label. It became a hit at #10 on the charts and was recorded later by many other popular jazz artists throughout the following decades, eventually becoming a jazz standard.

After listening to Chet Baker's cover, Elvis Costello became inspired and wrote Almost Blue off the album Imperial Bedroom, trying to capture its "erie" quality.

Notable versions 

 Chet Baker - Chet Baker Sings (1954)
 Chet Baker, Pretty/Groovy (World Pacific, 1958)
 Ella Fitzgerald - Hello Dolly! (1964)
 Stan Getz - Cool Velvet (1960)
 Stan Kenton - Standards in Silhouette (1959)
 Julie London - Julie... At Home (1960)
 Nina Simone - Gifted & Black (1970)
 Sarah Vaughan - Vaughan And Violins (1959)
 Victor Young (feat. Tommy Dorsey, Bing Crosby, & the Boswell Sisters) - Gems from "Geo. White's Scandals" (1931)

References 

1930s jazz standards
1931 songs
Jazz songs
Sarah Vaughan songs
Bing Crosby songs
Tommy Dorsey songs
Nina Simone songs
Ella Fitzgerald songs